Saint-Tricat is a commune in the Pas-de-Calais department in the Hauts-de-France region of France.

Geography
Saint-Tricat is located 5 miles (8 km) southwest of Calais, at the junction of the D215 and D246 roads.

Population

Places of interest
 The church of St. Nicaise  dating from the twelfth century.

See also
Communes of the Pas-de-Calais department

References

Sainttricat
Pale of Calais